Brighton and Hove Pride is an annual LGBT pride event held in the city of Brighton and Hove, England, organised by Brighton Pride, a community interest company (CIC) who promote equality and diversity, and advance education to eliminate discrimination against the lesbian, gay, bisexual and trans (LGBT) community.

The major event is an annual summer festival held in the first week of August, which usually consists of a parade through the city centre, a festival event in Preston Park, the Gay Village Party and other club parties. Since 2013, it has also included an Arts and Film Festival and a Pride Dog Show.

Pride attracts an estimated 500,000 people to the city over the Pride weekend across the Pride parade, Pride in the Park festival, and related events. Pride brings 2% of the city's annual visitors in one day and an estimated £30.5 million to the city's economy, credited as one of the main ways Brighton has boosted its economy from tourism.

History
Brighton and Hove Pride began with a gay demonstration in Brighton in October 1972 by The Sussex Gay Liberation Front (SGLF) and a full pride march  in July 1973.

Pride returned to the city in 1991 when Brighton Area Action Against Section 28 organised the first contemporary Pride - a weekend of events which brought hundreds to the streets. After a shaky start with a large event in 1992, followed by bankruptcy of the organising committee and a much more low-key series of events in 1993, the festival began to increase significantly in size in future years, eventually attracting the support of sponsors, pubs, clubs and drag artists. Since 1996, the park festival has been based at Preston Park.

Pride events have traditionally been an environment for celebrating the diversity of the lesbian and gay community. In 2002 Pride in Brighton & Hove agreed to explicitly include and reference the trans community making that year's Pride for the first time an LGBT event.

In 2004, Brighton Pride became a charity, to develop the event, to advance public education – by raising awareness of issues affecting LGBT people, and to make grants and donations to other charitable and voluntary organisations in the area.  In 2011, organisers controversially introduced an entry fee to the park festival, as the company was in financial ruin and ran up over £200,000 in debt. Since 2012, Pride has been under new management and has raised over £922,000 for local LGBT community groups over the past six years. The theme of the most recent event in 2019 was 'Generations of Love', which commemorates the 50th anniversary of the Stonewall riots in the US, seen as a watershed moment for gay rights and the starting point for the Pride movement.

In 2020, the 30th anniversary Pride was postponed due to the COVID-19 pandemic, however a programme of online streamed events took place during the weekend. On 5 May 2021, it was announced that Pride 2021 that had been anticipated to go ahead in a reduced form had been cancelled due to uncertainty over COVID-19 pandemic restrictions.

In 2022 Pride returned to celebrate 30 years of Pride with the parade, street party and the festival in Preston Park headlined by Christina Aguilera and Paloma Faith.

Pride festival
The weekend includes:
 The traditional community parade with floats, starting from the seafront via London Road to the Park
 "Pride in the Park" festival in Preston Park with headlining acts
 The Pride Village Party (PVP) in Kemptown and the seafront
 Several club parties around the city including Pleasure Gardens in Old Steine
 An arts and film festival
 A dog show

Headliners
Below is a list of artists who have headlined, or are planned to headline, on the main stage at Brighton Pride.

Gallery

See also 

 Kemptown, Brighton
 Gay Liberation Front
 LGBT community of Brighton and Hove
 Trans Pride Brighton

References

External links

  Official Brighton Pride website

Pride parades in England
Brighton and Hove
Festivals in Brighton and Hove
Summer events in England